Wei Jianjun (born 1964) is a Chinese businessman, chairman of Great Wall Motors, the largest Chinese SUV manufacturer.

Early life
Wei Jianjun was born in Baoding, Hebei, China.

Career
According to Forbes, Wei Jianjun has a net worth of $7.5 billion, as of January 2015.

Personal life
He lives in Baoding, Hebei.

References 

1964 births
Living people
Businesspeople from Baoding
Chinese billionaires
Chinese chief executives in the automobile industry
Great Wall Motors people
Automotive businesspeople